Senator O'Neil or O'Neill may refer to:

Jerry O'Neil (politician) (born 1943), Montana State Senate
William T. O'Neil (1850–1909), New York State Senate
William O'Neil (Wisconsin politician) (1848–1917), Wisconsin State Senate
Bill O'Neill (New Mexico politician), New Mexico State Senate
Charles O'Neill (Pennsylvania politician) (1821–1893), Pennsylvania State Senate
Edward J. O'Neill (Rhode Island politician), Rhode Island State Senate
Edward O'Neill (Wisconsin politician) (1820–1890), Wisconsin State Senate
Héctor O'Neill (born 1945), Senate of Puerto Rico
Isabelle Ahearn O'Neill (1880–1975), Rhode Island State Senate
James O'Neill (Washington politician) (1824–1913), Washington State Senate
John O'Neill (congressman) (1822–1905), Ohio State Senate
Lottie Holman O'Neill (1878–1967), Illinois State Senate